Coprosma areolata, commonly called thin-leaved coprosma, is a shrub that is native to New Zealand. C. areolata grows in wet, lowland forest and can also grow in exposed places. Coprosma is from the Greek kopros 'dung' and osme 'smell', referring to the foul smell of the species, literally 'dung smell'. And areolata is netted, with a network pattern between the veins.

References

areolata
Flora of New Zealand
Taxa named by Thomas Frederic Cheeseman